Serra (Latin for "saw") may refer to:

People
 Serra (footballer) (born 1961), Portuguese footballer
 Serra (surname)
 Serra (given name)

Cities, towns, municipalities

Brazil
Serra, Espírito Santo, a city in the Greater Vitória area
Amparo do Serra, in Minas Gerais
Araçoiaba da Serra, in São Paulo
Itapecerica da Serra, in São Paulo
Mirante da Serra, in Rondônia
Natividade da Serra, in São Paulo
Pé de Serra, in Bahia
Redenção da Serra, in São Paulo
Rio Grande da Serra, in São Paulo
Santa Maria da Serra, in São Paulo
São Lourenço da Serra, in São Paulo
Serra Azul, in São Paulo
Serra do Navio, in Amapá
Serra do Navio, in Amapá
Serra Negra, in São Paulo
Serra Talhada, in Pernambuco
Taboão da Serra, in São Paulo

Italy
La Serra, San Miniato, in Tuscany
Serra (Rocca Santa Maria), in Abruzzo
Serra d'Aiello, in Calabria
Serra de' Conti, in Marche
Serra Pedace, in Calabria
Serra Riccò, in Liguria
Serra San Bruno, in Calabria
Serra San Quirico, in Marche
Serra Sant'Abbondio, in Marche
Vaglio Serra, in Piedmont

Mexico
Jalpan de Serra, in Querétaro

Portugal
Jardim da Serra, in the Madeira Islands
Pampilhosa da Serra, in Coimbra
Santa Margarida da Serra, in Grândola
Santo António da Serra (Machico), in the Madeira Islands
Santo António da Serra (Santa Cruz), in the Madeira Islands
São Marcos da Serra, in Silves
Serra (Tomar), in Santarém
Serra de Água, in the Madeira Islands
Serra do Bouro, in Caldas da Rainha

San Marino
La Serra, in Acquaviva

Spain
Serra, Cape Verde
Serra, Valencia
Serra de Daró, in Catalonia
Serra de Portaceli, in the Valencian Community
La Serra d'en Galceran, in the Valencian Community

United States
Serra, an early name of Capistrano Beach, California

Mountain ranges

Angola
Serra da Chela, in south-central Angola

Brazil
Serra da Cangalha, in northeastern Brazil
Serra da Cantareira, in São Paulo
Serra da Mantiqueira, in southeastern Brazil
Serra da Ibiapaba, in Piauí and Ceará
Serra do Araripe, in Ceará and Pernambuco
Serra do Espinhaço, in Minas Gerais and Bahia
Serra do Mar, from Espírito Santo to Santa Catarina
Serra do Tiracambu, in Maranhão
Serra dos Aimorés, in Minas Gerais
Serra dos Órgãos, in Rio de Janeiro
Serra Gaúcha, in Rio Grande do Sul
Serra Geral, in Santa Catarina and northern Rio Grande do Sul

Cape Verde
Serra Negra, Cape Verde, in the island of Sal

Papua New Guinea
Serra Hills, in Sandaun Province

Portugal
Serra da Arrábida, in Setúbal
Serra da Estrela, in Beira Alta
Serra da Gardunha, in Cova da Beira
Serra de Monchique, in the Algarve
Serra de Sintra, in Sintra

Spain
Serra de Collserola, in Catalonia
Serra de Granera, in Catalonia
Serra del Montsec, in Catalonia
Serra del Montsià, in Catalonia
Several mountains in the Valencian Community, including:
Serra Calderona
Serra d'En Celler
Serra de Crevillent
Serra d'Espadà
Serra de l'Espadella
Serra d'En Galceran
Serra d'Irta
Serra de Mariola
Serra de Sant Pere
Serra de Vallivana
Serra de la Vall d'àngel

National parks
Aparados da Serra National Park, in Brazil
Serra da Canastra National Park, in Brazil
Serra da Capivara National Park, in Brazil
Serra da Estrela Natural Park, in Portugal
Serra do Cipó National Park, in Brazil
Serra do Mar coastal forests, in Brazil

Fauna
Banksia serra, shrub endemic to Western Australia
Cão da Serra de Aires, Portuguese herding dog
Cão da Serra da Estrela, Portuguese herding dog
Serra do Mar tyrannulet, species of bird endemic to Brazil
Serra do Mar tyrant-manakin, species of bird endemic to Brazil

Stadiums
Estádio Barão de Serra Negra, multi-use stadium in Piracicaba, Brazil
Estádio Serra Dourada, football stadium in Goiânia, Brazil

Other uses
Serra (dance), Pontic Greek dance
Serra (titular see), of the Roman Catholic Church, in Tunisia

See also
Serra Grande (disambiguation)
Serra High School (disambiguation)

Sera (disambiguation)
Sierra (disambiguation)
Cerro (disambiguation)
Serro (disambiguation)